Jacqueline Dubois (born 28 May 1957) is a French politician of La République En Marche! (LREM) who was member of the French National Assembly from the 2017 elections, representing the 4th constituency of the department of Dordogne.

Career
In parliament, Dubois served on the Committee on Cultural Affairs and Education. In addition to her committee assignments, she was a member of the French-British Parliamentary Friendship Group and the French-Irish Parliamentary Friendship Group.

In January 2019, the cars of Dubois and her husband were set on fire outside their Dordogne residence after threats broadcast online from the yellow vests movement. In July 2019, Dubois voted in favor of the French ratification of the European Union’s Comprehensive Economic and Trade Agreement (CETA) with Canada.

She lost her seat in the 2022 French legislative election to Sébastien Peytavie from Génération.s.

See also
 2017 French legislative election

References

1957 births
Living people
Deputies of the 15th National Assembly of the French Fifth Republic
La République En Marche! politicians
21st-century French women politicians
People from Fréjus
Politicians from Provence-Alpes-Côte d'Azur
Women members of the National Assembly (France)
Members of Parliament for Dordogne